Lindenberger is a surname. Notable people with the surname include:

 Alfred Lindenberger (1897–1973), German pilot
 Ethan Lindenberger (born 2000), American activist
 Klaus Lindenberger (born 1957), Austrian football player

German-language surnames